VCR was the 2003 debut recording by the band VCR, originally on Pop Faction Records as a limited-edition and regional release, created solely to sell at shows and give away to friends. When VCR was picked up by SideOneDummy.  the album was re-released with a wider distribution in 2005.

Track listings

2003 Pop Faction release
"Rad" – 2:40
"Back In Business" – 2:42
"King And Queen Of Winter" – 3:14
"Bratcore" – 2:07
"DVD" – 3:10
"We Are VCR" – 4:37

2005 SideOneDummy release
The extended play recording helped gain the attention of SideOneDummy, leading to its re-release in 2005, with a different album cover. "We Are VCR" is not included, but it does contain the demo versions of "Really Something" and "Destroy", which were recorded and released again on Power Destiny.  It includes a more thorough album booklet, with lyrics, as well as a different studio mix of the tracks, which was done by Bruce MacFarlane. 
"Rad" – 2:40
"Back In Business" – 2:41
"King And Queen Of Winter" – 3:15
"Bratcore" – 2:09
"DVD" – 3:08
"Really Something/Destroy" – 2:41
Note: Although the album lists "Really Something" and "Destroy" as separate tracks, they are actually combined as one audio track on the album.

Personnel
 Chad Middleton – vocals, keyboard
 Mya Anitai – vocals, keyboard
 Casey Tomlin – keyboard
 Steve Smith – keyboard
 Christian Newby – drums

Production
 Producer: VCR, Jason LaFerrera
 Mixing: Bruce MacFarlane for the factory (on the 2005 re-release)

2005 EPs
VCR (band) albums